Marriage in Transit is a 1925 American silent comedy film directed by Roy William Neill. It stars Edmund Lowe and Carole Lombard.

Plot
As described in a film magazine review, a Secret Service agent is assigned to recover a government code and capture the bandits that stole it. Because he resembles the ringleader of the bandits, he poses as him, recovers the code, marries the fiancée of the ringleader, and escapes. The young woman remains ignorant until later that she has married a Secret Service agent instead of a crook.

Cast

Preservation
With no prints of Marriage in Transit located in any film archives, it is a lost film.

References

External links

1925 films
1926 comedy films
1926 films
Lost American films
Silent American comedy films
Films directed by Roy William Neill
American black-and-white films
Fox Film films
Films with screenplays by Dorothy Yost
American silent feature films
1925 comedy films
1920s lost films
Lost comedy films
1920s American films